Vexillum exquisitum is a species of small sea snail, marine gastropod mollusk in the family Costellariidae, the ribbed miters.

Description

Distribution
This marine species occurs off the Tuamotu Islands, Tahiti, Cook Islands, Samoa and Fiji.

References

 Herrmann M. (2012) New species of Vexillum (Pusia) (Gastropoda: Costellariidae) from French Polynesia and the Philippines. Gloria Maris 51(2-3): 45–61. [8 April 2012]

External links
 Garrett, A. (1873). List of species of Mitridae collected at Rarotonga, Cook's Islands, with notes, also descriptions of new species. Proceedings of the Zoological Society of London. 1872: 839-843
 Souverbie, (M.). (1875). Descriptions d'espèces nouvelles de l'Archipel Calédonien (22e article). Journal de Conchyliologie. 23(4): 282-296, pl. 13

exquisitum
Gastropods described in 1873